Lucia Micarelli (born July 9, 1983) is an American violinist, singer and actress best known for her collaborations with Josh Groban, Chris Botti, Jethro Tull, and  her role as Annie Talarico in Treme.

Early life
Born in Queens, New York, of Italian (father) and Korean (mother) heritage, Micarelli began playing the violin at the age of three and played her first concert with an orchestra at six years old. Classically trained at Juilliard and the Manhattan School of Music, Micarelli also studied with Pinchas Zukerman.

Music career
Micarelli was the concertmaster with the Trans-Siberian Orchestra (TSO) on their Christmas Season Tour in 2003. After her tour with TSO, she joined Josh Groban on his Closer Tour as a guest soloist and concertmaster.

Micarelli appeared as a featured soloist with Ian Anderson (of Jethro Tull) in Vienna in 2006 with the Vienna Radio Orchestra.

In 2004, Micarelli released her first album Music From A Farther Room, executive-produced by Groban. It is a blend of classical pieces and familiar pop songs, including Queen's "Bohemian Rhapsody", David Bowie's "Lady Grinning Soul" and David Foster's "To Love You More". In May 2005, she opened for West End singer Michael Ball. In October and November 2005 and most of 2006, Micarelli toured the United States with Jethro Tull. In 2007, she toured with Groban again on the Awake Tour to promote his album Awake, and completed her second album, titled Interlude.

In 2008, Micarelli  toured with trumpeter Chris Botti. While on tour with Botti in July 2009, she injured her left hand badly enough to affect her ability to play. Her rehabilitation was successful, and she was soon playing again, as the numbness in three of her fingers slowly subsided. She also toured with Botti in 2015-2016.

She appeared on a PBS special on June 3, 2017, and appeared at the Vancouver Island Musicfest July 14–15, 2017.

Acting career
Micarelli played the role of musician Annie Talarico in HBO's television series Treme, about life in New Orleans after Hurricane Katrina.

Micarelli also had a role in an episode of WGN series Manhattan in 2014.

Micarelli plays the lead character, Kate, in the 2020 Hallmark Movies & Mysteries original movie, The Christmas Bow.

Discography

 Music from a Farther Room (2004)
 "Bohemian Rhapsody" in Josh Groban's Live at the Greek DVD (2004)
 duet with William Joseph in "Kashmir" single (2004)
 Interlude (2006)
 featured soloist "Kashmir" on Josh Groban's Awake Live DVD (2008)
 featured soloist on "Emmanuel" on Chris Botti in Boston (2009)
 featured soloist on Yael's The Love Project Journey DVD/CD (2010)
 featured soloist on several cuts on the CDs from the Treme TV show: "I Don't Stand a Ghost of a Chance" (2010), "New Orleans Blues" (2010), "Heavy Henry" (2011), "Spring Can Really Hang You Up" (2011), "Carved in Stone" (2011)
 duet (voice & violin) with Steve Earle "One More Cup of Coffee" in the Chimes of Freedom CD set (2012) issued by Amnesty International

References

External links

Description of appearance with Chris Botti in 2015-2016
Interview with "The Treatment"
Interview with KCRW News
Interview with Fox LA
Interview with NPR's "On Point," from WBUR

1983 births
Living people
Musicians from New York City
American actresses of Korean descent
American musicians of Korean descent
American people of Italian descent
American rock violinists
American television actresses
21st-century American women musicians
21st-century American violinists
Women violinists